Cyclostrema spiculigerum is a species of sea snail, a marine gastropod mollusk in the family Liotiidae.

Description
The height of the shell attains 2 mm, its diameter 3 mm. The small, white shell has a depressed discoidal shape and shows a deep umbilicus. It contains 4 whorls, including the two apical whorls. The aperture is round. The thin peristome is continuous. This species is remarkable for the coronal of equidistal abbreviated spicules, which denote the uppermost and most strongly developed of the spiral lirae in the two lowest whorls.

Distribution
This marine species occurs in the Persian Gulf.

References

External links
 OBIS: Cyclostrema spiculigerum

spiculigerum
Gastropods described in 1912